Vítor Manuel Gamito Gomes (born 21 April 1970, in Lisbon) is a Portuguese former cyclist. Professional between 1992 and 2004, he was the National Time Trial Champion in 1999 and 2000. His biggest win was the Volta a Portugal, which he won in 2000 after finishing four times in second place (1993, 1994, 1997 and 1999). He participated in the Vuelta a España three times, but failed to finish all three. Gamito also represented Portugal at the 2000 Summer Olympics, participating in the road race and in the time trial.

Major results 

1993
 1st Overall Grand Prix Jornal de Noticias
1st Stages 1 & 2
 2nd Overall Volta a Portugal
1st Stage 10
1994
 1st Overall Grand Prix Jornal de Noticias
1st Prologue & Stage 4
 1st Overall Volta ao Algarve
1st Stages 4 & 7
 2nd Overall Volta a Portugal
1st Stage 13
 3rd Overall Volta a Portugal do Futuro
1995
 1st Stage 3 (ITT) Troféu Joaquim Agostinho
 Volta a Portugal
1st Stages 4 & 13 (ITT)
 Volta a Portugal do Futuro
1st 2 Stages
 2nd Overall Rapport Toer
1996
 2nd Overall Volta a Portugal
1997
 4th Overall Vuelta Ciclista a la Comunidad Valenciana
1998
 2nd Time trial, National Road Championships
 2nd Overall Volta ao Alentejo
 2nd Overall Troféu Joaquim Agostinho
1st Stage 4a
 2nd Overall Grand Prix Jornal de Notícias
1st Stage 4
1999
 1st  Time trial, National Road Championships
 1st Stage 1 Grand Prix Sport Noticias
 2nd Overall Volta a Portugal
1st Stage 5
 3rd Overall Grand Prix Abimota
1st Stage 2
2000
 1st  Time trial, National Road Championships
 1st Overall Volta a Portugal
1st Stages 10 & 13
 5th Overall Volta ao Algarve
2001
2nd Grand Prix Mosqueteiros - Rota do Marques
2003
 1st Stage 6 Volta a Portugal
 1st Stage 4 Volta ao Alentejo
2014
 10th Time trial, National Road Championships

References

External links

1970 births
Living people
Portuguese male cyclists
Sportspeople from Lisbon
Cyclists at the 2000 Summer Olympics
Olympic cyclists of Portugal
Volta a Portugal winners